Ivan Ivanov (born 26 September 1974) is a Bulgarian gymnast. He competed in seven events at the 1996 Summer Olympics.

References

External links
 

1974 births
Living people
Bulgarian male artistic gymnasts
Olympic gymnasts of Bulgaria
Gymnasts at the 1996 Summer Olympics
Sportspeople from Varna, Bulgaria